Operation Sonnenblume (/Operation Sunflower) was the name given to the dispatch of German troops to North Africa in February 1941, during the Second World War. The Italian 10th Army had been destroyed by the British, Commonwealth, Empire and Allied Western Desert Force attacks during Operation Compass  The first units of the new  (DAK,  Erwin Rommel) departed Naples for Africa and arrived on 11 February 1941. (In the English-speaking world, the term  became a generic term for German forces in North Africa.) On 14 February, advanced units of the 5th Light Afrika Division (later renamed the 21st Panzer Division),  3 (Reconnaissance Battalion 3) and  39 (Anti-tank Detachment 39) arrived in Tripoli, Libya and were sent immediately to the front line east of Sirte.

Rommel arrived in Libya on 12 February, with orders to defend Tripoli and Tripolitania, albeit using aggressive tactics. The first German troops reached Sirte on 15 February and advanced to Nofilia on 18 February. On 24 February, a German raiding party ambushed a British patrol near El Agheila. On 24 March, the Axis captured El Agheila and on 31 March attacked Mersa Brega. The understrength 3rd Armoured Brigade failed to counter-attack and began to retreat towards Benghazi the next day.

When the 3rd Armoured Brigade moved, its worn-out tanks began to break down, as had been predicted. Rommel split his forces into small columns to harry the British retreat as far the Axis fuel and water shortage permitted. A considerable British force was captured at Mechili, which led to the British retreat continuing to Tobruk and then on to the Libyan–Egyptian frontier. Axis forces failed to capture Tobruk in the first rush and Rommel then had to divide the Axis forces between Tobruk and the frontier.

 succeeded because the ability of the Germans to mount an offensive was underestimated by General Archibald Wavell, the Commander in Chief Middle East, the War Office and Winston Churchill. Rommel transformed the situation by his audacity, which was unexpected, despite copious intelligence reports from Ultra and MI 14 (British Military Intelligence). Many British units had been transferred to Greece and others to Egypt to refit. Some commanders appointed by Wavell to Cyrenaica Command (CYRCOM) were unable to live up to expectations and Wavell relied on maps that were found to be inaccurate when he later arrived to see for himself. In 1949, Wavell wrote  "I had certainly not budgeted for Rommel after my experience of the Italians. I should have been more prudent...".

Background

Italian invasion of Egypt

 was the Italian invasion of Egypt in 1940 to seize the Suez Canal and which began the Western Desert Campaign (1940–1943). The Italians were opposed by British, Commonwealth, and Free French forces. After numerous delays, the scope of the offensive was reduced to an advance by the 10th Army (Marshal Rodolfo Graziani) into Egypt, as far as Sidi Barrani and attacks on any British forces in the area. The 10th Army advanced about  into Egypt but only made contact with the British screening force from the 7th Armoured Division and did not engage the main force around Mersa Matruh. Graziani intended to use the road to accumulate supplies for an advance on Mersa Matruh, about  further east, where the remainder of the 7th Armoured Division and the 4th Indian Division were based.

Operation Compass

The British Western Desert Force (WDF, Lieutenant-General Sir Richard O'Connor) attacked the 10th Army in western Egypt and Cyrenaica, the eastern province of Libya from December 1940 to February 1941. The 10th Army was swiftly defeated, Sidi Barrani and Sollum were re-captured, and the British continued the operation, attacking through Cyrenaica to capture Bardia, Tobruk, and Derna. The British then pursued the 10th Army along the  around the Jebel Akhdar (Green Mountain) towards the western province of Tripolitania. Combe Force, an  flying column, moved through the desert south of the Jebel and intercepted the last organised units of the 10th Army at the Battle of Beda Fomm. The WDF then chased the remnants of the 10th Army to El Agheila on the Gulf of Sidra.

The British were unable to continue beyond El Agheila, due to supply difficulty and worn-out vehicles. In February 1941, the British War Cabinet decided to hold Cyrenaica with the minimum of forces and send the remainder to Greece. The most experienced, best-trained, and best-equipped units of the WDF were diverted to the Greek Campaign in Operation Lustre in March and April 1941. In Cyrenaica, the 6th Australian Division was up to strength but the vehicles of the 7th Armoured Division were worn out. The 2nd New Zealand Division had two brigades available and the 6th Infantry Division in Egypt had no artillery and was training for operations in the Dodecanese Islands. The 7th Australian Division (Major-General John Lavarack) and the 9th Australian Division were poorly-equipped and still training, a Polish Brigade Group was short of equipment and two armoured regiments, detached from the 2nd Armoured Division to the 7th Armoured Division, had also been worn out in the later stages of Operation Compass. The rest of the division had two cruiser tank regiments whose tanks had worn-out tracks and two light tank regiments; the divisional commander had died suddenly and been replaced by Major-General Michael Gambier-Parry.

Siege of Giarabub

The Siege of Giarabub (now Jaghbub), took place in the aftermath of the defeat of the 10th Army. The fortified Italian position at the Al Jaghbub Oasis was besieged by parts of the 6th Australian Division. Air transport proved insufficient and hunger prompted many of the locally recruited troops to desert. After being reinforced by the 2/9th Australian Battalion and a battery of the 4th Royal Horse Artillery, the Australians attacked on 17 March 1941 and forced the Italian garrison to surrender on 21 March.

Terrain

Scorpions, vipers and flies populated the region, which was inhabited by a small number of Bedouin nomads.

Bedouin tracks like the Trigh el Abd and Trigh Capuzzo, linked wells and the easier traversed ground; navigation was by sun, star, compass and "desert sense", good perception of the environment gained by experience. When Italian troops advanced into Egypt in September 1940, the Maletti Group left Sidi Omar and got lost, having to be found by reconnaissance aircraft. In spring and summer, the days are miserably hot and nights are very cold. The Sirocco ( or ), a hot desert wind, blows clouds of fine sand which reduces visibility to a few yards and coats eyes, lungs, machinery, food,and equipment. Motor vehicles and aircraft need special oil filters. In such barren country, supplies for military operations have to be transported from outside.

Supply

On land, supplies had to be carried huge distances by road or in small consignments by coaster.

The road could flood, was vulnerable to attacks by the Desert Air Force (DAF) and using desert tracks increased vehicle wear. With seven Axis divisions, air and naval units,  of supplies per month were needed. British attacks from Malta had some effect but in May, the worst month for shipping losses,  of the supplies arrived. Lack of transport in Libya left German supplies stranded in Tripoli, while the Italians had only  for deliveries to  A record amount of supply arrived in June but at the front, shortages worsened.

Prelude

German intervention

By January 1941,  X had  bombers,  bombers, forty twin-engined fighters, and twenty reconnaissance aircraft. X took over  operations in southern Italy, Sicily, and part of Sardinia, and later took over in North Africa, with orders to secure the sea route from Italy to North Africa by neutralising Malta.

On 24 October 1940, after an investigation of the possibility of military operations in North Africa, General Wilhelm Ritter von Thoma reported to Adolf Hitler that supply difficulties determined what could be achieved, given the North African climate and terrain, and British control of the Mediterranean. The minimum necessary force to capture Egypt was four divisions, which was also the maximum force which could be supplied from Italy, but Hitler refused to consider sending more than one armoured division. On 12 November, Hitler issued Directive 18, ordering that a panzer division be prepared to move to North Africa. On 3 February, Hitler agreed to send another panzer division to join the 5th Light Afrika Division ( Johann von Ravenstein). The first German troops reached Libya on 14 February and the first tanks on 20 February. A panzer corps of two divisions had been recommended by General Hans von Funck after a visit to Libya in January, and by General Enno von Rintelen, the senior military attaché in Rome, but Hitler agreed only to send another panzer regiment. Other elements of the 15th Panzer Division ( Maximilian von Herff) began to arrive in late April.

The tanks were also adapted for desert conditions, with better engine cooling achieved by increasing the speed of the radiator fan and by cutting holes in the hatch covers of the engine compartment. Panzer Regiment 5 of the 5th Light  Division arrived in North Africa aboard two convoys from  1941.

The regiment had  three  (small command vehicles) and four  (command vehicles). Another 25 Panzer I  to reinforce the regiment arrived in Tripoli on 10 May. The tanks in Panzer Regiment 5 were still painted dark grey and carried the 3rd Panzer Division emblem of an inverted Y with two strikes. On 18 January, Panzer Regiment 8 with  part of the 10th Panzer Division was transferred to the new 15th Panzer Division, which had been created from the 33rd Infantry Division. Panzer Regiment 8 was shipped to Libya in three convoys from  1941 and by 28 May, had completed its assembly in North Africa.

Axis command

After General Giuseppe Tellera was killed on 7 February at the Battle of Beda Fomm, General Italo Gariboldi took over command of the remnants of the 10th Army and on 25 March, replaced Graziani as the Governor-General of Libya. Rommel had been ordered in January by the Commander in Chief of the German army,  Walther von Brauchitsch, to defend Tripoli and Tripolitania, albeit using aggressive tactics. The German high command had no intention of obtaining complete victory in Africa and on a visit to Berlin, even after the limited advance from Tripoli,  along the Gulf of Sirte to Sirte and then another  on to Nofilia on 19 March, Rommel was told not to expect reinforcements.

CYRCOM
The 9th Australian Division and the 2nd Armoured Division (minus a brigade group sent to Greece), were left to garrison Cyrenaica under Cyrenaica Command (Lieutenant-General Henry Maitland Wilson), despite the inadequacy of the force if the Germans sent troops to Libya. Command in Egypt was taken over by Lieutenant-General Richard O'Connor and the XIII Corps HQ was replaced by the HQ of the 1st Australian Corps (Lieutenant-General Thomas Blamey). It was believed by General Archibald Wavell the Commander-in-Chief Middle East and GHQ in Egypt, that the Germans could not be ready until May, by when the 2nd Armoured Division tanks would have been overhauled and two more divisions and support troops, particularly artillery, would be ready, along with the 9th Australian Division. The 2nd Armoured Division had a reconnaissance regiment; the 3rd Armoured Brigade had an understrength light tank regiment and one equipped with captured Fiat M13/40 tanks. The cruiser regiment arrived in late March, after many break downs en route, which brought the division up to an understrength armoured brigade. Two brigades of the 9th Australian Division were swapped with two from the 7th Australian Division, which were less well trained and were short of equipment and transport.

Attempts by the British to re-open Benghazi were frustrated by lack of transport, poor weather and from early February,  bombing and mining of the harbour. The attacks led the British to abandon attempts to use it to receive supplies and to evacuate the Italian stores and equipment captured during Operation Compass. Lack of transport made it impossible to supply a garrison west of El Agheila, which was the most favourable position for a defensive line and restricted the 2nd Armoured Division to movement between supply dumps, reducing its limited mobility further. In February, Lieutenant-General Philip Neame took over CYRCOM and predicted that many of the tanks would break down as soon as they moved. (Neame also discovered that he had to rely on the local telephone system staffed by Italian operators.) Neame wanted a proper armoured division, two infantry divisions and adequate air support to hold the area. Wavell replied that there was little to be sent and nothing before April. In early March, the 9th Australian Division began to relieve the 6th Australian Division at Mersa Brega for Operation Lustre, which demonstrated the difficulty of tactical moves with insufficient transport. On 20 March, the Australians were withdrawn north of Benghazi to Tocra, near Er Regima for ease of supply and the 2nd Armoured Division took over.

There were no easily defended positions between El Agheila and Benghazi, the terrain being open and good tank country. Neame was ordered to conserve the tank units as far as possible, yet inflict losses on the Axis forces if they attacked, fight a delaying action as far as Benghazi if pressed and abandon the port if necessary. There was no prospect of reinforcement before May so the high ground of the escarpment nearby and the defiles to the north near Er Regima and Barce in the Jebel Akhdar, were to be held for as long as possible. The tanks would have to use depots at Msus, Tecnis, Martuba, Mechili, Timimi, El Magrun and Benghazi as a substitute for lorry-borne supply. The 3rd Indian Motor Brigade (Brigadier E. W. D. Vaughan) arrived at Martuba in late March, with all its transport but no tanks, artillery, anti-tank guns and only half its wireless sets, to be ready to move towards Derna, Barce or Mechili if the Axis attacked.

Battle

24 March – 2 April

British air reconnaissance had observed German troops west of El Agheila on 25 February and by 5 March, it was expected that the German commander would consolidate the defence of Tripolitania, try to recapture Cyrenaica and then invade Egypt. The Germans were expected to use Sirte and Nofilia as bases but not before April; Rommel was identified on 8 March but local intelligence was hard to find. The mileage restrictions necessary to maintain the few troops and vehicles near the front and the danger from fast German  (eight-wheeler armoured cars) inhibited British reconnaissance units, whose armoured cars were slower and had inferior armament.

The British withdrew from Mersa Brega, followed up by the Germans as the Ariete Division and the Brescia Division advanced from Tripoli. The 5th Light  Division was ordered on to Ajdabiya (Agedabia) and the harbour of Zuetina, despite Italian objections. Air reconnaissance on 3 April, revealed that the British were still retiring and Rommel ordered a probe around the southern flank by an Italian detachment and several German platoons were sent under Lieutenant-Colonel Gerhard von Schwerin towards Maaten el Grara, from where they were to observe the ground towards Msus, south-east of Benghazi and Ben Gania further south. Reconnaissance Unit 3 was ordered to reconnoitre towards Soluch and Ghemines; during the evening Rommel ordered them on to Benghazi.

3–5 April

On 3 April, Gambier-Parry had received a report that a large enemy armoured force was advancing on Msus (now Zawiyat Masus in the Fati Municipality), site of the main divisional supply dump. The 3rd Armoured Brigade (Brigadier R. G. W. Rimington) moved there and found that the petrol had been destroyed to prevent capture. Conflicting reports led Neame to countermand these orders, which caused the Australians much confusion. On 6 April, British air reconnaissance reported that there were Axis columns in the desert and the 3rd Indian Motor Brigade repulsed an attack at Mechili, which led to O'Connor at the CYRCOM headquarters (Neame had left to visit Gambier-Parry), to order a general withdrawal.

The headquarters of the 2nd Armoured Division and the 2nd Support Group were ordered back to Mechili followed by the 3rd Armoured Brigade. Rimington decided that the armoured brigade lacked the fuel to reach Mechili and ordered a move to Maraura, where a small amount of petrol was found. Rimington planned to move to Derna via Giovanni Berta to obtain more fuel; Rimington was captured with his deputy when he motored ahead. The brigade continued on and crowded the Australians, who were bypassing Derna, as they withdrew to Gazala. The Australians had collected every vehicle that could move and withdrawn at  behind extensive demolitions, covered by the 1st Battalion King's Royal Rifle Corps (1st KRRC), a motor battalion recently arrived from Egypt.

Despite more objections from Gariboldi, Rommel decided that the advance must go faster if the British were to be trapped. On the night of  Reconnaissance Unit 3 entered Benghazi and that morning Rommel ordered it to continue to Mechili, as soon as the Brescia Division arrived. As units reached Benghazi, Rommel formed them into columns, Group Schwerin was sent to Tmimi and Group Fabris, composed of motorcyclists and the Ariete divisional artillery, to Mechili followed by the rest of the Ariete Division. General Streich, the 5th Light  Division commander, was ordered on to Tobruk with Machine-Gun Battalion 8, part of Panzer Regiment 5 and an anti-tank company.

Reconnaissance Unit 3 was stopped by the 2nd Support Group artillery west of Charruba and Group Olbrich reached Antelat, with a machine-gun unit having pressed on to the east of Sceleidima; Group Kirchheim had a column at Driana and the other at Er Regima. Air reconnaissance on 5 April, showed that the British were still retreating; Rommel ordered the Axis columns to meet at Mechili. Group Fabris and the Ariete Division were stalled between Ben Gania and Tengeder, south of Mechili and in the evening Rommel detached Machine-gun Battalion 8 (Lieutenant-Colonel Gustav Ponath) from Group Streich and led it to Mechili, where the advanced units of Group Schwerin arrived early on 6 April. Ponath was sent on towards Derna with a small party, by which time Group Kirchheim had one column near Maddalena and the other east of El Abiar. Reconnaissance Unit 3 had hardly moved and Group Olbrich had run out of fuel again. Ponath reached the coast road and advanced on the airfield south of Derna early on 7 April.

6–8 April

On 6 April, the Ariete Division reached Mechili and at noon, Ponath re-assembled his group near Derna airfield and cut one of the British withdrawal routes. The 5th Royal Tank Regiment (5th RTR, Lieutenant-Colonel H. D. Drew), repulsed two determined attacks and then counter-attacked with the last four British tanks. The rest of the British disengaged before the tanks were knocked out and the road was left open for stragglers in Derna. Neame had ordered CYRCOM headquarters to move back to Tmimi, west of Tobruk, where the Chief of Staff, Brigadier John Harding arrived early on 7 April, to find no sign of Neame or O'Connor. Harding ordered CYRCOM to move into Tobruk and reported his fears to Wavell in Egypt.

Rommel had intended to attack Mechili on 7 April but the Axis forces were scattered, short of fuel and tired. Group Fabris moved forward during the morning but the Ariete Division and Group Streich took all day to arrive, having been attacked by the RAF; A Squadron of the Long Range Desert Group had appeared from the south, to harass Axis movements. (The 18th Australian Infantry Brigade had arrived from Egypt by sea after the dispatch of the 7th Australian Division to Greece had been cancelled.) A small force held El Adem, south of Tobruk to observe the approaches from the south and south-west and at Mechili, Gambier-Parry had the 2nd Armoured Division headquarters soft-skinned vehicles and a cruiser tank, most of the 3rd Indian Motor Brigade, M Battery 1st Royal Horse Artillery, part of the 2/3rd Australian Anti-tank Regiment and elements of other units.

The Germans tried twice to bluff Gambier-Parry into surrender but he had received orders from CYRCOM to break out and retreat to El Adem, Gambier-Parry decided to attack at dawn, to gain a measure of surprise. On 8 April, A Squadron of the 18th Cavalry broke through and then turned to attack Italian artillery, as some Indian troops of the 11th Prince Albert Victor's Own Cavalry (Frontier Force) got away. Most of the garrison was pinned down but during a second attempt at  small parties of the 2nd Royal Lancers escaped. The garrison had fired most of its small-arms ammunition at the vision slits of the German tanks, which had hung back in fear of mines and when Italian infantry attacked, had little ammunition left. Gambier-Parry and  Indian and Australian troops surrendered to Major-General Pietro Zaglio, commander of the Pavia Division.

Tobruk

By 8 April, the most advanced German units had arrived at Derna but some units which had cut across the chord of the Jebel, ran out of water and fuel at Tengeder. Prittwitz, the commander of the 15th Panzer Division was sent ahead with a column of reconnaissance, anti-tank, machine-gun and artillery units, to block the eastern exit from Tobruk, as the 5th Light  Division moved from the south-west and the Brescia Division advanced from the west. Rommel hoped to pursue CYRCOM across Egypt and take Alexandria but overstretched supply lines, opposition from OKW and the British defence of Tobruk made this impossible.

On 10 April, Rommel made the Suez Canal the objective of the DAK and ordered that a break-out from Tobruk was to be prevented. Next day the port was invested but the rush ended with the 5th Light  Division on the east side, Group Prittwitz to the south (Prittwitz having been killed) and the Brescia Division to the west. Reconnaissance Unit 3 went on to Bardia and a composite force was sent on to Sollum to try to reach Mersa Matruh but was prevented by the British Mobile Force (Brigadier William Gott) on the frontier, which conducted a delaying action around Sollum and Capuzzo. The garrison had armoured cars and captured Italian tanks, which could raid Axis supply convoys as they passed Tobruk for the frontier and made impossible an Axis invasion of Egypt.

Aftermath

Analysis

In 1956, I. S. O. Playfair, the British official historian wrote that British assumptions about the time needed for an Axis counter-offensive were not unrealistic but were confounded by the boldness of Rommel and the fact that the 3rd Armoured Brigade was a brigade in name only, no tanks were available for the re-equipping of the brigade or the two in the 7th Armoured Division back in Egypt. When the DAK attacked there was no armoured force capable of counter-attacking or cutting Axis communications. By the time the British had retreated into the Jebel Akhdar, the infantry lacked mobility, the tanks of the 3rd Armoured Brigade had fallen to pieces and the only reserve was a motor brigade without tanks, artillery and anti-tank guns. For as long as the Axis forces had the fuel to manoeuvre, the British had no defence against outflanking attacks to the south. The retreat to Tobruk succeeded but the first Italo-German offensive had been an operational success and a "triumph for Rommel".

The  and  had little influence on operations, despite the disadvantages faced by the DAF during the retreat. The  was not under army authority and chose the objectives of the air forces. Many strafing attacks were made on parties of British troops and vehicles but these were not concentrated on bottlenecks, despite the few routes of retreat round the Cyrenaican bulge and south of the Jebel Akhdar. The DAF had been depleted to provide squadrons for Greece and had only two fighter and one bomber squadron until 8 April when another bomber squadron arrived. The fighter squadrons had to resort to wasteful standing patrols over important areas and were able occasionally to give cover to traffic jams but were unable to prevent air attacks on two petrol convoys, which were destroyed. The British lacked the aircraft to keep air superiority and the Axis air forces made no consistent attempt to seize it, leading to the influence of both sides being sporadic.

Supply constraints had made it impossible for the Axis to advance much beyond the frontier wire on the Libyan–Egyptian border by mid-April. As long as the port of Tobruk was held by the British, the Axis position on the border was unstable, as the Italo-Germans were distracted by the siege, while the British could rebuild their strength in Egypt. The British Mobile Force columns based at Halfaya, Sofafi, Buq Buq and Sidi Barrani began to harass the Germans in the area around Capuzzo and Sollum and after an ambush near Sidi Azeiz, the local German commander sent an alarmist report to Rommel, leading to an attack by Group Herff from  that pushed the British back to Buq Buq and Sofafi but the April attacks on Tobruk were costly failures.

Cooper wrote in 1978, that Tobruk had been invested on 11 April, after a twelve-day advance. German tanks had proved superior to their British counterparts but the Axis could not maintain a force further east than Sollum, without Tobruk. Preparations would have to be made to repel a British counter-attack from Egypt, the chronic lack of fuel determining movement more than tactics. (Italian Armed Forces High Command) wanted a pause before advancing into Egypt, as did Hitler, who also considered the capture of Tobruk to be essential; Rommel demanded more aircraft to carry ammunition, fuel and water forward. General Friedrich Paulus, a deputy Chief of the General Staff, was sent to Africa to report on the situation. The British received through Ultra a decrypt of the Paulus report but the "considerable intelligence coup" was mishandled, encouraging the premature attack of Operation Brevity.

The potential of the Germans to mount an offensive was underestimated and the capability, audacity and potential Rommel had to transform the situation was overlooked by Wavell, the War Office and Winston Churchill, despite copious intelligence reports from Ultra and MI 14 (British Military Intelligence). In 1949, Wavell wrote that he had taken an unwarranted risk in Cyrenaica, having formed expectations of the Axis based on the experience of fighting the Italian army; "I had certainly not budgeted for Rommel after my experience of the Italians. I should have been more prudent...."

Casualties
The British lost  when much of the 3rd Indian Motor Brigade was forced to surrender at Mechili on 8 April. Lieutenant-generals Neame and O'Connor, Gambier-Parry the 2nd Armoured Division commander, Brigadier R. Rimington and Lieutenant-Colonel J. F. B. Combe were captured. From  the 3rd Armoured Brigade lost most of its tanks to mechanical breakdown, fuel shortage and demolitions to prevent them being captured. About twenty tanks had been returned earlier to Tobruk for repairs and another three unserviceable tanks were salvaged during the retreat;  tanks were knocked out but many were recovered later and repaired.

Subsequent operations

Siege of Tobruk

From 11 to 12 April, Panzer Regiment 5 probed the defences of the 20th Australian Brigade near the El Adem road and was repulsed by artillery-fire; German infantry who reached the anti-tank ditch were forced back by Australian infantry. The Germans were surprised, having assumed that the shipping at Tobruk was there to evacuate the garrison and planned an attack by the 5th Light  Division for the night of  Groups of Axis vehicles were attacked by 45 and 55 squadrons RAF, which rearmed at the airfields inside the perimeter. The attack began with an attempt to get over the anti-tank ditch west of the El Adem road, in the 2/17th Australian Battalion sector and was repulsed. Another attempt was made later and by dawn a small bridgehead had been established, where Panzer Regiment 5 drove through and turned northwards, ready to divide into one column for the harbour and one to move west and cut off the garrison but the advance was stopped. The Italians had been slow to provide blueprints for the port fortifications and after three weeks, Rommel suspended the attacks and resumed the siege. Italian infantry divisions took up positions about the fortress, while the bulk of the DAK maintained a mobile position south and east of the port, keeping the frontier in easy reach.

Operation Brevity

Operation Brevity  was a limited British offensive, planned as a rapid blow against the weak Axis front-line forces around Sollum, Fort Capuzzo and Bardia on the Egyptian–Libyan frontier. The British had received an Ultra intercept of the report compiled by Paulus, which dwelt on the exhaustion and the dire supply situation facing the Axis at Tobruk and the frontier, which encouraged a premature attempt to inflict losses on the Axis frontier garrisons and to capture jumping-off places for a later attack towards Tobruk. The garrison of Tobruk,  to the west, had resisted Axis attacks and its Australian and British troops could still endanger the Axis supply line from Tripoli, which led Rommel to give priority to the siege, leaving the front line thinly held. On 15 May, Gott attacked with a mixed infantry and armoured force in three columns.

Halfaya Pass was taken against determined Italian opposition and in Libya, the British captured Fort Capuzzo but German counter-attacks regained the fort during the afternoon, inflicting a costly defeat on the defenders. The operation had begun well and had thrown the Axis commanders into confusion but most of its early gains were lost to counter-attacks and with German reinforcements arriving from Tobruk, the operation was called off. Gott became concerned that his forces risked being caught in the open by German tanks and conducted a staged withdrawal to the Halfaya Pass on 16 May. From 26 to 27 May, German troops recaptured the pass in Operation Skorpion. The British resumed preparations for Operation Battleaxe which began on 15 June.

See also

 List of World War II Battles
 North African campaign timeline
 List of German military equipment of World War II
 List of Italian military equipment in World War II
 List of British military equipment of World War II
List of Australian military equipment of World War II

Orders of battle

5th Light  Division
 Panzer Regiment 5
 50  I
 45  II
 71  III
 20  IV
 3 
 4 
 Reconnaissance Battalion 3

15th  Division (arrived in stages up to May 1941)
 Panzer Regiment 8 (I & II Battalions)
 45  II
 71  III
 20  IV
 4 
 6 
 Motorized Rifle Regiment 104 (1 lorried battalion, 1 motor-cycle battalion, 1 battalion on foot)
 Motorcycle Battalion 15
 Reconnaissance Battalion 33
 Motorized Artillery Regiment 33 (I, II & III Battalions)
 Engineer Battalion 33
 Battery, Anti-tank Battalion 33
 Battery, anti-aircraft 
 33rd divisional services

Cyrenaica Command and British Troops Egypt

GHQ Middle East Forces

Libya
Cyrenaica Command
 1st King's Royal Rifle Corps
 1re  (1 BIM)
 2nd Armoured Division
 143rd Field Park Troop, RE attached from 7th Armoured Division
 4th Field Squadron RE attached from 7th Armoured Division
 1st King's Dragoon Guards
 2nd Armoured Division Signals
 2nd Support Group
 9th Rifle Brigade (renamed from 1 Bn, Tower Hamlets Rifles, 15 January 1941)
 1re Compagnie, 1re Bataillon d'Infanterie de Marin (1 BIM)
 'D/J' Battery, 3rd Royal Horse Artillery
 104th (Essex Yeomanry) Royal Horse Artillery
 1st Company, Free French Motor Battalion attached
 3rd Armoured Brigade
 3rd The King's Own Hussars
 5th Royal Tank Regiment
 6th Royal Tank Regiment
 16th Australian Antitank Company attached
 1st Royal Horse Artillery attached
 9th Australian Division
 2/3rd Antitank Regiment, Royal Australian Artillery (9th Battery only, 10th & 11th Batteries detached to 3rd Indian Motor Brigade, 12th Battery in Palestine until 5 April 1941)
 51st Field Regiment, RA attached
 2/13th Field Company, Royal Australian Engineers
 2/3rd Field Company, Royal Australian Engineers
 2/7th Field Company, Royal Australian Engineers
 1st Royal Northumberland Fusiliers attached.
 One company detached to 9th Rifle Brigade from 26 March 1941
 2/1st Australian Pioneer Battalion
 20 Australian Infantry Brigade
 2/13th Australian Battalion
 2/15th Australian Battalion
 2/17th Australian Battalion
 20th Australian Antitank Company
 24th Australian Infantry Brigade
 2/28th Australian Battalion
 2/43rd Australian Battalion
 24th Australian Antitank Company
 26 Australian Infantry Brigade
 2/23rd Australian Battalion
 2/24th Australian Battalion
 2/48th Australian Battalion
 26th Australian Antitank Company
 3rd Indian Motor Brigade
 18th King Edward VII's Own Cavalry
 2nd Royal Lancers (Gardner's Horse)
 Prince Albert Victor's Own Cavalry (11th Frontier Force)
 2/3rd Antitank Regiment, Royal Australian Artillery
 10 & 11 Batteries attached from 9th Australian Division

Egypt

HQ British Troops Egypt
 11th Hussars (Prince Albert's Own)
 1st (Royal) Dragoons
 107th (South Notts Hussars) Royal Horse Artillery
 4th Royal Horse Artillery
 11th Czechoslovak (Middle Eastern) Battalion

Spring 1941
 4th Royal Tank Regiment
 7th Royal Tank Regiment
 7th Armoured Division
 4th Armoured Brigade
 2nd Royal Tank Regiment
 7th Queen's Own Hussars
 7th Armoured Brigade
 1st Royal Tank Regiment
 8th (King's Royal Irish) Hussars
 7th Support Group
 2nd Battalion, The Rifle Brigade
 'C' Battery, 4th Royal Horse Artillery
 3rd Royal Horse Artillery
 'M/P' Battery only, 'D/J' Battery with 2 Support Group
 Polish Independent Carpathian Rifle Brigade
 I Rifle Battalion
 II Rifle Battalion
 III Rifle Battalion
 1st Anti-tank Company
 2nd Anti-tank Company
 Carpathian Artillery Regiment
 Engineers Group (HQ, 2 Companies)
 The Legion of Polish Officers attached
 Carpathian HMG Battalion
 Medical Services (2 Companies, 2 Sections, Forward Hospital)
 Transport Column (3 Platoons)
 Carpathian Lancers Regiment
 Signals Group (HQ, 1 Company, 3 Platoons)

Alexandria Sub-Area
 18th Australian Infantry Brigade
 Part of 7th Australian Division, en route for Greece
 2/10th Australian Battalion
 2/12th Australian Battalion
 2/9th Australian Battalion
 2/4th Field Company, Royal Australian Engineers
 6th Australian Divisional Cavalry Regiment

Mersa Matruh Sub-Area
 8th Field Regiment, RA

Suez Canal Sub-Area
 GHQ Troops
 6th Infantry Division
 54th Field Company, RE
 16th Infantry Brigade
 1st Argyll & Sutherland Highlanders (Princess Louise's)
 2nd Leicestershire Regiment
 2nd Queen's Royal Regiment (West Surrey)
 22nd (Guards) Infantry Brigade
 1st Durham Light Infantry
 2nd Scots Guards
 3rd Coldstream Guards
 Layforce (attached)
 'A' Battalion Commando
 'B' Battalion Commando
 'C' Battalion Commando
 'D' Battalion Commando

Notes

Footnotes

References

 
 
 
 
 
 
 
 
 
 
 
 
 
 
 
  no isbn

Further reading

External links
 Chadwick, Rommel's First Offensive
 Kirkland Rommel's Desert Campaigns
 Italian tables of organisation
 British tables of organisation

Sonnenblume
1941 in Libya
Sonnenblume
Erwin Rommel
Sonnenblume
Sonnenblume
Sonnenblume
February 1941 events
March 1941 events
April 1941 events
May 1941 events